Sven Müller may refer to:

 Sven Müller (footballer, born 1980), German footballer
 Sven Müller (racing driver) (born 1992), German racing driver
 Sven Müller (footballer, born 1996), German footballer